Seán Ó Catháin (fl. 1726) was an Irish scribe.

Little is known of Ó Catháin. He transcribed Trí Biorghaoithe an Bháis – by Seathrún Céitinn – and Beatha Chaitríona, "air forálamh an óig úasail róonoraigh fhíorchartannaidh .i. Fhroinnsais Óig a Blake mhic Tomais oíghreadh na bForbach" (for Francis Óg son of Thomas Blake of Furbogh, County Galway) in 1726, now British Library Egerton MS 184. He wrote RIA 23 G 4, containing history, genealogy and poetry, sometime between 1722 and 1729.

See also
 Geoffrey Keating
 Mary Bonaventure Browne
 Dubhaltach Mac Fhirbhisigh
 Ruaidhrí Ó Flaithbheartaigh
 John O'Donovan (scholar)

References
 Scríobhaithe Lámhscríbhinní Gaeilge I nGaillimh 1700–1900, William Mahon, in "Galway:History and Society", 1996

Irish scribes
People from County Galway
18th-century Irish writers
18th-century Irish male writers
Place of birth unknown
Place of death unknown
Irish-language writers